Pablo Antonio Morales Pérez (17 August 1906 – 24 November 1969) was a Venezuelan baseball executive and promoter.

Born in La Guaira, Vargas, Morales was a widely known figure in Venezuelan baseball during the 1930s and 1960s. Publicist and avid sport commentator, Morales worked in La Guaira and then in Caracas. His total dedication to baseball came in 1936, when he founded the Deportivo Caracas the same year and the Cardenales de La Guaira in 1940, clubs that participated in the Liga Nacional de Béisbol, which had stabilized the first national championship of first division in Venezuela since its inauguration in 1930.

Morales later served as president of the International Baseball Federation in two periods (1946–1947; 1951–1952), and also took the reins of the organizing committee of the VII Amateur Baseball World Series held in Caracas in 1944. This event is presently known as the Baseball World Cup.

Likewise, the first ever Caribbean Series tournament was the brainchild of Morales and Oscar Prieto Ortiz, his business partner since 1936, who devised the idea during Morales' IBF tenure and after seeing the success of the Serie Interamericana in 1946, which featured the clubs Brooklyn Bushwicks from the United States, Cervecería Caracas from Venezuela, Sultanes de Monterrey from Mexico, and an All-Star team from Cuba. The US team won each year from 1946 to 1949, while the Venezuelan club won the final tournament in 1950. Morales and Prieto then presented their idea to baseball representatives of Cuba, Panama and Puerto Rico during a meeting held in Havana on August 21, 1948. The representatives then agreed to stage a four-country, round-robin tournament 12-game to be known as the Serie del Caribe, to be launched in Cuba from February 20–25 of 1949.

Morales bought the Cervecería Caracas franchise in 1952 and renamed it as a new franchise as Leones del Caracas, to run one of the most popular and culturally significant clubs of the Venezuelan Professional Baseball League. Morales would remain the sole owner of the team until shortly before his death in 1969, when he included Prieto as legal partner.

In August 2015, Pablo Morales was enshrined into the Venezuelan Baseball Hall of Fame and Museum.

Sources

1906 births
1969 deaths
People from Caracas
People from La Guaira
20th-century Venezuelan businesspeople
Venezuelan sportspeople